William Power (February 21, 1849 – December 11, 1920) was a Canadian politician.

Born in the parish of Sillery, Canada East, the son of William Power and Bridgit Fitzgerald, both Irish, Power was educated at the Commercial Academy of Quebec. A lumber merchant, he was elected to the House of Commons of Canada for Quebec West in a 1902 by-election, after the death of the sitting MP, Richard Reid Dobell. A Liberal, he was re-elected in 1904 but was defeated in 1908. He was elected again in 1911 but did not run in 1917.

He married Susan Winifred Rockett. His son, Charles Gavan Power, was an MP and senator. His grandson, Francis Gavan Power was an MP. His great-grandson Lawrence Cannon is a Conservative MP and cabinet minister. His son William Gerard Power was a member of the Legislative Council of Quebec; another son, Joseph Ignatius Power was a member of the Legislative Assembly of Quebec, and also played professional hockey; yet another son, James Power, was also a professional hockey player, and a soldier.

Electoral record

References
 The Canadian Parliament; biographical sketches and photo-engravures of the senators and members of the House of Commons of Canada. Being the tenth Parliament, elected November 3, 1904

External links

1849 births
1920 deaths
Liberal Party of Canada MPs
Members of the House of Commons of Canada from Quebec
Anglophone Quebec people
Politicians from Quebec City
People from Sainte-Foy–Sillery–Cap-Rouge